Łomy may refer to the following places:
Łomy, Lubusz Voivodeship (west Poland)
Łomy, Podlaskie Voivodeship (north-east Poland)
Łomy, Warmian-Masurian Voivodeship (north Poland)